Liu Benying is a Chinese swimmer. He won the gold medal at the Men's 200 metre freestyle S2 event at the 2016 Summer Paralympics with a world record and paralympic record of 3:41.54. He also won the silver medal at the Men's 100 metre backstroke S2 event with 1:48.29 and the silver medal at the Men's 50 metre backstroke S2 event with 48.84.

References

Living people
Swimmers at the 2016 Summer Paralympics
Medalists at the 2016 Summer Paralympics
Paralympic gold medalists for China
Paralympic silver medalists for China
Paralympic swimmers of China
Chinese male backstroke swimmers
Chinese male freestyle swimmers
Year of birth missing (living people)
Paralympic medalists in swimming
S2-classified Paralympic swimmers
21st-century Chinese people